Ricchi e Poveri ("The Rich and The Poor") is an Italian pop group formed in Genoa in 1967, originally consisting of Angela Brambati, Angelo Sotgiu, Franco Gatti and Marina Occhiena. Active since the late 1960s, they have sold over 20 million records.

History

1967–1969: Formation and early years 
The group was created in 1967 as a polyphonic quartet by singers Angela Brambati, Angelo Sotgiu, Franco Gatti and Marina Occhiena in 1967. All from Genoa, only Sotgiu has Sardinian roots. The band got their name from Roman songwriter Franco Califano who once joked that they were "spiritually rich and financially poor". The quartet earned its own unique vocal style, based on the intertwining of four different voices: bass, tenor, alto and soprano.

Their first public appearance was in Cantagiro 1968 with "L'ultimo amore". Ricchi e Poveri has participated in the Sanremo Music Festival several times since 1970; in 1971 they sang there "Che sarà", which was performed by José Feliciano and by the composer of the song's music, Jimmy Fontana. 1971 was the last year of the Sanremo festival in which each song was performed twice, each time by a different artist. Ricchi e Poveri gave the second performance of the song, following Feliciano, who had worldwide hits with Italian, Spanish and English versions of the song. 

Ricchi e Poveri represented Italy at the Eurovision Song Contest 1978 with the song "Questo amore" finishing 12th with 53 points. In 1981 Marina Occhiena left the group to pursue a solo career.

Ricchi e Poveri has recorded in Italian and Spanish some of theIr 1980s and 1990s hits, including "Mamma Maria", "Made in Italy", "M'innamoro di te" and "Se m'innamoro".

Sarà perché ti amo 
In 1981 the band recorded a Spanish version of the single "Sarà perché ti amo". The song, retitled "Será porque te amo", became a hit in Mexico, the Caribbean, and in Central and South America.

Several groups covered the song, adapting it to different genres including tropical, dance, and various forms of Mexican folk music known as Grupera. The Latino boy band projects Los Chicos and Los Chamos, and the Italo-Dance band Eu4ya also covered the song, but the lyrics were heavily altered; only the chorus line was kept in one verse and the rest was rearranged to make the song more appealing to teenagers.

The song is featured in some film soundtracks: L'Effrontée (1985), Spike of Bensonhurst (1988), High Tension (2003) and Unmade Beds (2009).

As of 2007 the song is still being covered in all genres and it has achieved somewhat of a cult/nostalgia status in several Spanish-speaking countries, as a symbol of a generation. The song was remade in 2008 in German, by Diana Sorbello as "Das ist, weil ich dich liebe" and in 2011, in Dutch, by Monique Smit and Tim Douwsma as "Eén zomeravond met jou".

Recent years 
Ricchi e Poveri held two massive concerts in the Mediterranean island of Malta on the 12 and 13 June 2009. The band’s popularity in Malta resulted in another concert on 6 November 2010. Ricchi e Poveri completed a tour of Italy and Slovenia in 2012, followed at the beginning of 2013 with a three song set in the Discoteka 80's concert in Moscow.

In 2016 the group's founder, Franco Gatti, retired from the group at the age of 74. 

In 2020 the original line-up reunited to celebrate the 50th anniversary of the band’s debut at the Sanremo Music Festival.

Gatti died on 18 October 2022 at the age of 80.

In 2023 Ricchi e Poveri toured Australia with concerts in Sydney, Melbourne and Adelaide.

Personnel 
 Angela Brambati – vocals (1967–present)
 Angelo Sotgiu – vocals, guitars, saxophones (1967–present)
 Franco Gatti – guitars, vocals, keyboards (1967–2016, 2020–2021; died 2022)
 Marina Occhiena – vocals (1967–1981, 2020–2021)

Discography 

 Ricchi e Poveri (1970)
 Amici miei (1971)
 Penso sorrido e canto (1974)
 RP2 (1975)
 Ricchi & Poveri (1976)
 I musicanti (1976)
 Questo amore (1978)
 La stagione dell'amore (1980)
 E penso a te (1981)
 Mamma Maria (1982)
 Voulez-vous danser (1984)
 Dimmi quando (1985)
 Pubblicità (1987)
 Buona giornata e... (1990)
 Allegro italiano (1992)
 Parla col cuore (1999)
 Perdutamente amore (2012)
 ReuniON (2021)

Compilations 
 1972 — Un diadema di successi
 1978 — Ricchi & Poveri
 1982 — Come eravamo
 1982 — Profili musicali
 1983 — Made in Italy
 1984 — Ieri e Oggi
 1990 — Canzoni d'amore
 1990 — Una domenica con te
 1993 — Anche tu...
 1994 — I più grandi successi
 1997 — Piccolo Amore
 1998 — BMG Collection
 2000 — I grandi successi originali
 2008 — Greatest Hits
 2011 — Le canzoni, la nostra storia

Singles in English 
 1981 — "Make It With Me"/"Sarà perché ti amo"

References

External Links
 
 

 

Italian musical groups
Musical groups established in 1967
Eurovision Song Contest entrants for Italy
Eurovision Song Contest entrants of 1978
Sanremo Music Festival winners
Spanish-language singers of Italy
Musical groups from Liguria